Secular Buddhism—sometimes also referred to as agnostic Buddhism, Buddhist agnosticism, ignostic Buddhism, atheistic Buddhism, pragmatic Buddhism, Buddhist atheism, or Buddhist secularism—is a broad term for a form of Buddhism based on humanist, skeptical, and agnostic values, valuing pragmatism and (often) naturalism, eschewing beliefs in the supernatural or paranormal. It can be described as the embrace of Buddhist rituals and philosophy for their secular benefits by people who are atheist or agnostic.

Secular Buddhists interpret the teachings of the Buddha and the Buddhist texts in a rationalist and often evidentialist manner, considering the historical and cultural contexts of the times in which the Buddha lived and in which the various sutras and tantras were written.

The secular Buddhist framework strips Buddhist doctrine of various traditional beliefs that could be considered superstitious, or that cannot be tested through empirical research, such as: supernatural beings (such as devas, bodhisattvas, nāgas, pretas, Buddhas, etc.), merit and its transference, rebirth, and karma, Buddhist cosmology (including the existence of pure lands and hells), etc.

Traditional Buddhist ethical views regarding social issues such as abortion and human sexuality may or may not be called into question as well, with some schools, especially Western Buddhist ones, taking alternative stances.

History 

Secular Buddhism has its roots in Buddhist modernism and secular humanism, and is part of the broad trend of secularization that has been ongoing in the West since the recovery of classical Greek culture in the Renaissance. Many aspects of secular Buddhism are associated with the abandonment of hierarchical features of Buddhist monastic culture among some lay Buddhist practice communities in the West during the last decades of the 20th century in favor of democratic principles of civic association and the inclusion of women, disrupting traditional structures of patriarchal authority and gender exclusivity.

The Insight Meditation movement in the United States was founded on modernist secular values. Jack Kornfield, an American teacher and former Theravadin monk, stated that the Insight Meditation Society wanted to present Buddhist meditation "without the complications of rituals, robes, chanting and the whole religious tradition." S. N. Goenka, a popular teacher of Buddhist Vipassana meditation, taught that his practice was not a sectarian doctrine, but “something from which people of every background can benefit: an art of living.” This essentially treats Buddhism as an applied philosophy, rather than a religion, or relies on Buddhist philosophy without dogmatism. While recent scholarship has shown that such framings of Buddhist tradition were in large part rhetorical, and that teachers such as Goenka retained their traditional religious commitments in enacting their teachings and disseminating their meditation practices, such rhetorical reframing had a powerful impact on how Buddhism was appropriated and repackaged in the context of the emergent globalities of the latter part of the twentieth century.

Stephen Batchelor is a self-proclaimed secular Buddhist who promotes a strictly secular form of Buddhism. Batchelor was a Buddhist monk ordained in the more traditional forms of Buddhism. From his experience as a monk practicing Tibetan Buddhism and later Zen, he felt the need for a more secular and agnostic approach. In his books Buddhism Without Beliefs and Confession of a Buddhist Atheist he articulates his approach to the Buddha's teaching, describes Siddhārtha Gautama as a historic person rather than an idealized religious icon, and scrutinizes typical Buddhist doctrines dealing with the concept of an afterlife. In his book After Buddhism he promotes a skeptical philosophical interpretation of Buddhism akin to the Hellenistic philosophical tradition of Pyrrhonism. Batchelor suspects that Pyrrho learned some Buddhism while Pyrrho was in India as part of Alexander the Great's conquest and that Pyrrhonism may reflect the skepticism of Early Buddhism before Buddhism fell into dogmatism.

Key concepts and practices 
Unlike the various kinds of Buddhist modernism, which tend to be modifications of traditional schools of Buddhist thought and practice in the light of the discourses of modernity, secular Buddhism is founded on a reconfiguration of core elements of the dharma itself. To this end it seeks to recover the original teachings of Siddhattha Gautama, the historical Buddha, yet without claiming to disclose "what the Buddha really meant". Rather, it interprets the early canonical teachings in a way that draws out their meaning in the Buddha's own historical context (the culture of the Gangetic plains in the fifth century BCE) while demonstrating their value and relevance to people living in our own time. Both aspects of this interpretation are literally "secular" in that they evoke the Latin root word saeculum – a particular age or generation. The ethos of the movement is captured in Stephen Batchelor's Confession of a Buddhist Atheist.

Secular Buddhism proposes metaphysical beliefs and soteriology of Indian religious culture be left behind. This culture saw human life as an irredeemable realm of suffering, from which one should seek transcendence in an enduring beyond-human condition – a stance that virtually all Buddhist schools, as well as Hinduism and Jainism, perpetuate. Secular Buddhism, on the other hand, seeks to impart the Buddha's teaching as a guide to full human flourishing in this life and this world. In adopting a post-metaphysical philosophy, it parts company with existing religious forms of Buddhist orthodoxy, which have evolved since the Buddha's death. Instead, it aligns itself with today's post-metaphysical philosophy, not least phenomenology, so finding itself on a convergent path with similar movements in radical Christian theology, found in the work of thinkers such as Don Cupitt and Gianni Vattimo.

Secular Buddhism rejects power structures legitimated by the metaphysics of orthodox Buddhist belief. It questions notions of spiritual progress based on standardized prescriptions for meditation practice, as well as the idea that Buddhist practice is essentially concerned with gaining proficiency in a set of meditative techniques endorsed by the authority of a traditional school or teacher. Instead, secular Buddhism emphasizes a praxis,  encouraging autonomy and equally encompassing  every aspect of one's humanity, as modeled by the noble eight-fold path (right view, intention, speech, action, livelihood, effort, mindfulness and concentration). Such an approach is open to generating a wide range of responses to specific individual and communal needs, rather than insisting on there being "one true way" to "enlightenment" valid for all times and places.

See also 

 Adevism
 Buddhism in the Americas
 Buddhism in the West
 Buddhist modernism
 Buddhist paths to liberation
 Criticism of Buddhism#Arguments of secular origin
 Index of Buddhism-related articles
 Religious views on truth
 Schools of Buddhism
 Secular spirituality
 Shambhala Buddhism
 Similarities between Pyrrhonism and Buddhism
 Spiritual but not religious
 Spiritual naturalism

Notes and references

Further reading

External links 
 Secular Buddhism in Tricycle's Buddhism for Beginners series

Applied philosophy
Buddhism and atheism
Secularism
Secular humanism
Religious atheism